Memetic warfare is a modern type of information warfare and psychological warfare involving the propagation of memes on social media.

History
In fiction, the 2002 game Transhuman Space presented the world of 2100 as having "memetics" as a key technology, and the 2004 expansion "Transhuman Space: Toxic Memes" gave examples of "memetic warfare agents".

Memetics: A Growth Industry in US Military operations was published in 2005 by Michael Prosser, now a Lieutenant Colonel in the Marine Corps. He proposed the creation of a 'Meme Warfare Center'.

In Evolutionary Psychology, Memes and the Origin of War (2006), Keith Henson defined memes as "replicating information patterns: ways to do things, learned elements of culture, beliefs or ideas."

Memetic warfare has been seriously studied as an important concept with respects to information warfare by NATO's Strategic Communications Centre of Excellence. Jeff Giesea, writing in NATO's Stratcom COE Defense Strategic Communications journal, defines memetic warfare as "competition over narrative, ideas, and social control in a social-media battlefield. One might think of it as a subset of ‘information operations’ tailored to social media. Information operations involve the collection and dissemination of information to establish a competitive advantage over an opponent".
According to Jacob Siegel, "Memes appear to function like the IEDs of information warfare. They are natural tools of an insurgency; great for blowing things up, but likely to sabotage the desired effects when handled by the larger actor in an asymmetric conflict."

The Taiwanese government installed memetic engineering teams in each government department which can respond within 60 minutes to disinformation efforts using a “humor over rumor” approach. These teams primarily counter Chinese political warfare efforts and domestic disinformation. The Political Warfare Bureau of the Ministry of National Defense oversees similar units.

United States presidential election, 2016

Memetic warfare on the part of 4chan and r/The_Donald sub-reddit is widely credited with assisting Donald Trump in winning the election in an event they call 'The Great Meme War'. According to Ben Schreckinger, "a group of anonymous keyboard commandos conquered the internet for Donald Trump—and plans to deliver Europe to the far right."

In a 2018 study, a team that analyzed a 160M image dataset discovered that the 4chan message board /pol/ and sub-reddit r/The_Donald were particularly effective at spreading memes. They found that /pol/ substantially influenced the meme ecosystem by posting a large number of memes, while r/The_Donald was the most efficient community in pushing memes to both fringe and mainstream web communities.

References

Further reading
 https://fas.org/irp/agency/army/mipb/2010_02.pdf "Memetic Warfare: The Future of War"; Hancock, Brian J. 2010 

Psychological warfare
Internet memes